The 2001 College Football All-America Team is composed of the following All-American Teams: Associated Press, Football Writers Association of America, American Football Coaches Association, Walter Camp Foundation, The Sporting News, Pro Football Weekly, Football News and CNN-Sports Illustrated.

The College Football All-America Team is an honor given annually to the best American college football players at their respective positions. The original usage of the term All-America seems to have been to such a list selected by football pioneer Walter Camp in the 1890s. For 2001 the NCAA officially recognized All-Americans selected by the AP, AFCA, FWAA, TSN, and the WCFF to determine Consensus All-Americans.

Offense

Quarterback
Eric Crouch, Nebraska (AFCA-Coaches, AP-All Purpose, TSN)
Rex Grossman, Florida (Walter Camp, AP, CNNSI, FN)
Antwaan Randle El, Indiana (FWAA)

Running back
Luke Staley, BYU (Walter Camp, AFCA-Coaches, FWAA, AP, TSN, PFW, FN, CNNSI)
William Green, Boston College (Walter Camp, AFCA-Coaches, TSN, PFW, FN)
Travis Stephens, Tennessee (FWAA, AP, CNNSI)
DeShaun Foster, UCLA  (SN)

Wide receiver
Jabar Gaffney, Florida (Walter Camp, AFCA-Coaches, FWAA, AP, TSN, FN, CNNSI)
Josh Reed, LSU (Walter Camp, FWAA, AP, TSN, PFW, CNNSI)
Marquise Walker, Michigan (AFCA-Coaches)
Lee Evans, Wisconsin (PFW, FN)

Tight end
Daniel Graham, Colorado (AP, AFCA-Coaches, FWAA, TSN, Walter Camp, FN, PFW)
Jeremy Shockey, Miami (Florida) (CNNSI)

Tackle
Bryant McKinnie, Miami (Florida) (Walter Camp, AFCA-Coaches, FWAA, AP, TSN, PFW, FN, CNNSI)
Mike Pearson, Florida (FWAA, AP, TSN)
Mike Williams, Texas (Walter Camp, AFCA-Coaches, PFW, FN)
Terrence Metcalf, Ole Miss (Walter Camp, AFCA-Coaches, FN)
Joaquin Gonzalez, Miami (Florida) (FWAA, CNNSI)

Guard
Toniu Fonoti, Nebraska (Walter Camp, FWAA, AP, TSN, PFW, FN, CNNSI)
Andre Gurode, Colorado (AP, TSN, PFW, CNNSI)
Eric Heitmann, Stanford (AFCA-Coaches, FN)

Center
LeCharles Bentley, Ohio State (Walter Camp, AFCA-Coaches, FWAA, AP, TSN)
Seth McKinney, Texas A&M (PFW)
Frank Romero, Oklahoma (CNNSI)

Defense

End
Dwight Freeney, Syracuse (Walter Camp, AFCA-Coaches, FWAA, AP, TSN, PFW, FN, CNNSI)
Julius Peppers, North Carolina (Walter Camp, AFCA-Coaches, FWAA, AP, TSN, PFW, FN, CNNSI)
Alex Brown, Florida (Walter Camp, FWAA, AP, CNNSI)
Dewayne White, Louisville (PFW)

Tackle
John Henderson, Tennessee (Walter Camp, AFCA-Coaches, FWAA, AP, TSN)
Wendell Bryant, Wisconsin (AFCA-Coaches, FN, CNNSI)
Ryan Sims, North Carolina (PFW)
Larry Tripplett, Washington (FN)

Linebacker
Rocky Calmus, Oklahoma (Walter Camp, AFCA-Coaches, FWAA, AP, TSN, CNNSI)
E.J. Henderson, Maryland (Walter Camp, FWAA, AP, TSN, PFW, FN, CNNSI)
Robert Thomas, UCLA (Walter Camp, FWAA, AP, TSN, PFW, FN)
Levar Fisher, N.C. State  (AFCA-Coaches, AP)
Jermaine Petty, Arkansas  (AFCA-Coaches)
Kalimba Edwards, South Carolina (TSN)
Andra Davis, Florida (CNNSI)
Larry Foote, Michigan (FN)

Cornerback
Quentin Jammer, Texas (Walter Camp, AFCA-Coaches, FWAA, AP, TSN, PFW, FN, CNNSI)
Keyuo Craver, Nebraska  (TSN, PFW, FN, CNNSI)
Phillip Buchanon, Miami (Florida) (PFW)

Safety
Roy Williams, Oklahoma (Walter Camp, AFCA-Coaches, FWAA, AP, TSN, PFW, FN, CNNSI)
Ed Reed, Miami (Florida) (Walter Camp, AFCA-Coaches, FWAA, AP, TSN, PFW, FN, CNNSI)
Mike Doss, Ohio State (Walter Camp)
Tank Williams, Stanford  (AFCA-Coaches)
Troy Polamalu, USC (FWAA)
Lamont Thompson, Washington State (AP)

Special teams

Kicker
Damon Duval, Auburn (Walter Camp, AFCA-Coaches, AP)
Seth Marler, Tulane (FWAA)
Todd Sievers, Miami (Florida)  (CNNSI)

Punter
Travis Dorsch, Purdue (Walter Camp, AFCA-Coaches, AP, TSN-PK, FN-PK, CNNSI)
Jeff Ferguson, Oklahoma (TSN)
Dave Zastudil, Ohio (FWAA, PFW, FN)

All-purpose player / return specialist
Herb Haygood, Michigan State (Walter Camp, PFW, CNNSI-KR)
Bernard Berrian, Fresno State (AFCA-Coaches)
Luke Powell, Stanford (FWAA)
Roman Hollowell, Colorado (TSN, CNNSI-PR)
André Davis, Virginia Tech (PFW)

See also
 2001 All-Big 12 Conference football team
 2001 All-Big Ten Conference football team
 2001 All-SEC football team

References

Coaches' – AFCA
Associated Press – AP 
Writers' – FWAA
The Sporting News – TSN
Walter Camp – Walter Camp
PFW (Archived 2009-05-14) – Pro Football Weekly
CNNSI – Sports Illustrated
FN – Football News

All-America Team
College Football All-America Teams